Maho Junction Railway Station (also known as Mahawa railway station) is a junction railway station in the town of Mahawa. Owned by Sri Lanka Railways, the state-owned railway operator, the station is part of the Northern line which links north of the country with the capital Colombo.

The station opened in 1903 when the Northern line was extended from Kurunegala to Anuradhapura. In 1926 the station became a junction station, following the completion of the Batticaloa line.

Continuity

References 

Railway stations on the Northern Line (Sri Lanka)
Railway stations on the Batticaloa Line
Railway stations in Kurunegala District